David Michael Syring is an American anthropologist and Professor of Anthropology at the University of Minnesota Duluth. He is known for his works on the Saraguro people.

Career
Syring received his BA from Cornell College (Mount Vernon, IA) in 1989 and her PhD from Rice University in 1997. He is a former editor-in-chief of Anthropology and Humanism. During his career at the University of Minnesota Duluth, he developed a Participatory Media Lab with Mitra Emad (Professor of Anthropology at UMD).

Books
 With the Saraguros: The Blended Life in a Transnational World. University of Texas Press 2015
 Places in the World a Person Could Walk: Family, Stories, Home and Place in the Texas Hill Country. University of Texas Press 2001

References 

American anthropologists
Living people
University of Minnesota Duluth faculty
Rice University alumni
Cultural anthropologists
Year of birth missing (living people)
Cornell College alumni